The Chi River is a Chinese river that is tributary to the Hanshui, or Han River, which ultimately flows into the Yangtze.

Notes

Rivers of Shaanxi